"Litoria" castanea, also known as the yellow-spotted tree frog, New England swamp frog, tablelands bell frog, or yellow-spotted bell frog, is a species of frog in the subfamily Pelodryadinae. It is a critically endangered species of frog that is endemic to south-eastern Australia.

Taxonomy
The placement of "Litoria" castanea is considered as incertae sedis within the subfamily Pelodryadinae and its temporary inclusion in the genus Litoria is indicated by the quotation marks around the genus name. It is presumed that it will ultimately be returned to the genus Ranoidea along with the other members of the former Litoria aurea species complex.

Description 
"Litoria" castanea is distinguished by cream markings on its thighs. Its overall colour is pale green and the dark to black spots are highlighted by the bronze patches. The toes are entirely webbed.

Distribution and habitat
"Litoria" castanea is endemic to the New England Tablelands bioregion of south-eastern Australia.

The species favours permanent water bodies and its natural habitats are temperate grassland, rivers, intermittent rivers, swamps, freshwater lakes, intermittent freshwater lakes, freshwater marshes, intermittent freshwater marshes, and ponds.

Conservation
No recorded sighting had been made since 1980, and by 2004 the species was considered as possibly extinct. The reasons behind its drastic decline are unclear, but the disease chytridiomycosis is suspected to have played a major role. However, in late 2009 New South Wales Fisheries field scientist Luke Pearce located a surviving population of the frogs.  Scientists acted quickly to establish a small "insurance" colony. Soon after, the wild colony was eradicated due to two consecutive floods and an outbreak of chytrid fungus. Following a breeding program at Sydney's Taronga Zoo, in early 2018, a colony of yellow-spotted bell frogs was released in a secret location in the New South Wales' southern tablelands.

References

External links

Litoria
Frogs of Australia
Amphibians of New South Wales
Endemic fauna of Australia
Amphibians described in 1867
Taxa named by Franz Steindachner
Taxonomy articles created by Polbot